Ahelepola Kumarihami colloquially as Ehelepola Kumarihami is a 2014 Sri Lankan Sinhala epic historical film directed by Sugath Samarakoon and produced by Gayan Ranadheera for Rupun Films. It stars Dulani Anuradha and Jackson Anthony in lead roles along with Sriyantha Mendis and Nadeeka Gunasekara. Music composed by Rohana Weerasinghe. It is the 1208th Sri Lankan film in the Sinhala cinema. The film is about the tragic historic incidence, where the last king of Sri Lanka, King Sri Vickrama Rajasinha slaughtered the entire family of Ehelepola Nilame due to mistaken as a betrayer to the Kandyan Kingdom.

The film reached 50 days. The official website www.ahelepolakumarihami.com was launched in June 2014.

Cast
 Dulani Anuradha as Ehelepola Kumarihami
 Anura Dharmasiriwardena as Ehelepola Nilame
 Jackson Anthony as King Sri Vickrama Rajasinha
 Pramuditha Udaya Kumara as Madduma Bandara Ehelapola
 Chamindu Bawantha as Loku Bandara Ehelapola
 Sriyantha Mendis as Keppetipola Disawe
 Buddhadasa Vithanarachchi as Rev. Wariyapola Sri Sumangala Thero
 Cletus Mendis as Molligoda Adikaram
 Nadeeka Gunasekara as Pusselle Kumarihami
 Lucky Dias as Aritta Kee-Vendu
 Susil Perera as Kalawana
 Giriraj Kaushalya as Lokuru Naide
 Chanchala Warnasuriya as Venkata Rajamma
 Vishaka Siriwardana as Molligoda Kumarihami
 Sugath Wijesekara as Dingirala
 Sandun Wijesiri
 Wilson Karunaratne
 Vinu Siriwardena
 Aravinda Dombagahawaththa as Mampitiya
 Rinsley Weeraratne
 Anura Bandara Rajaguru

References

External links
අනේ දෙවියනේ මට වුණු වියෝයා ලක්ෂ හයසිය අසූවක් වතුරේ ගියෝයා
ඔහු නිෂ්පාදකයකු නෙවෙයි කූට වෙළෙන්ඳෙක්

2014 films
2010s Sinhala-language films
Films set in the Kandyan period